The Equestrian Association of the Philippines (EAP) is the national governing body for equestrian sports in the Philippines.

External links
Equestrian Association of the Philippines profile at the Philippine Olympic Committee website

Philippines
Equestrian sports in the Philippines
Equestrian